The Junior League World Series Latin America Region is one of six International regions that currently sends teams to the World Series in Taylor, Michigan. The region's participation in the JLWS dates back to 2000.

Latin America Region Countries

Region Champions
As of the 2022 Junior League World Series.
See: .
Prior to 2000, the champions of Mexico and Puerto Rico received automatic bids to the World Series. From 2000 to 2003, both Mexico and Puerto Rico were part of the Latin America Region. Starting in 2004, the Mexico Region has an automatic berth in even-numbered years and the  Puerto Rico Region in odd-numbered years. In the alternating years that each region does not have an automatic bid, that region's teams compete in the Latin America Region tournament.

Mexico Region Champions

Puerto Rico Region Champions

Latin America Region Champions

Results by Country (Latin America Region Champions)
As of the 2022 Junior League World Series.

See also
Latin America Region in other Little League divisions
Little League
Little League – Caribbean
Little League – Latin America
Little League – Mexico
Intermediate League
Senior League
Senior League – Caribbean
Senior League – Latin America
Big League

References

Latin America
Latin American baseball leagues